Mindig Magasabbra is the fourth studio album by Hungarian rock band Locomotiv GT, released in 1975.  It was their first album with János Karácsony.

Track listing
"Intuitio molto furtivamente" - 3:58
"Andante" (Presser)
"Vivace kalapaccio" (Laux)
"Allegro, allegro" (Presser)
"Szólj rám, ha hangosan énekelek" - 4:40 (Presser, Anna Adamis)
"Arra mennék én" - 3:20 (Presser)
"Mindig magasabbra" - 3:54 (Presser, Laux)
"És jött a doktor" - 4:28 (Presser)
"Neked írom a dalt" - 5:20 (Presser)
"Álomarcú lány" - 4:47 (Somló, Adamis)
"Nekem ne mondja senki" - 3:57 (Somló, Adamis)
"Egy elfelejtett szó" - 4:05 (Presser, Adamis)
"Ülök a járdán" - 3:46 (Somló, Adamis)

Personnel

Gábor Presser — vocals, organ, piano
János Karácsony — guitars, vocals
Tamás Somló — bass, alto saxophone, harp, vocals
József Laux — drums, percussion

External links 
Information on the official LGT website
Lyrics on the official LGT website
Information on the Hungaroton website

1975 albums
Locomotiv GT albums